Ruslan Yuriyovych Perekhoda (born 18 July 1987) is a cross-country skier from Ukraine. He represented Ukraine at the 2014 Winter Olympics.

Career
Perekhoda started his career at major competitions in March 2007 when he competed at the 2007 Junior World Ski Championships in Tarvisio. His World Cup debut took place on November 25, 2011, in Kuusamo, Finland, where he was 84th in sprint competition. As of January 2022, his best World Cup achievement was 26th rank in sprint freestyle in Sochi on February 1, 2013. His best team performance (together with Vitaliy Shtun, Myroslav Bilosyuk, and Oleksiy Shvidkiy) was 19th in relay on November 25, 2012, in Gällivare.

Olympic debut occurred at the 2014 Winter Games in Russian Sochi. There Perekhoda was 50th in sprint and 20th in team sprint (together with Oleksii Krasovskyi) competitions. He did not qualify to represent Ukraine at the 2018 Winter Olympics.

In 2022, Ruslan Perekhoda was nominated for his second Winter Games in Beijing.

Perekhoda participated at five World Championships: in 2013, 2015, 2017, 2019, and 2021. His best personal performance was 49th in sprint in 2017. He also took part in four Universiades (2009, 2011, 2013, and 2015), with his best personal result being 16th in 30 km free style mass start in 2015.

Career results

Winter Olympics

World Championships

World Cup

Rankings

References

External links

1987 births
Living people
Ukrainian male cross-country skiers
Cross-country skiers at the 2014 Winter Olympics
Cross-country skiers at the 2022 Winter Olympics
Olympic cross-country skiers of Ukraine
Paralympic sighted guides
Competitors at the 2009 Winter Universiade
Competitors at the 2011 Winter Universiade
Competitors at the 2013 Winter Universiade
Competitors at the 2015 Winter Universiade
Sportspeople from Kharkiv Oblast